Armado may refer to:
Armardeh, a city in Iran
A character in Love's Labour's Lost
Grupo Armado, a Nicaraguan rock band

See also
Armada (disambiguation)
Armadillo (disambiguation)